São Geraldo is a municipality in the Brazilian state of Minas Gerais. As of 2020, the estimated population was 12,562.

It was founded on 7 March 1949.

See also
 List of municipalities in Minas Gerais

References

Municipalities in Minas Gerais